Anclote Key Preserve State Park is a Florida State Park and historic site, located on Anclote Key three miles (5 km) off Tarpon Springs along the Atlantic coastal plain. This state park is only accessible by boat. Amenities include primitive camping on the northern portion of the island as well as picnic pavilions and grills. Wildlife includes  the American oystercatcher, bald eagle and piping plover. The park is unique in that a lighthouse, built in 1887, is on the southern end of the key in Pinellas County, Florida. Three Rooker Island, south of Anclote and part of the preserve, remains an important Gulf Coast beach-nesting bird sanctuary.

Recreational activities
The park has such amenities as beaches, birding, primitive camping, boating, fishing, hiking, picknicking areas and wildlife viewing.

References
Florida Online Park Guide -Anclote Key Preserve State Park, Southwest- Visit our Florida State Parks. Online. January 7, 2006.

External links
Anclote Key Preserve State Park at Florida State Parks

State parks of Florida
Parks in Pinellas County, Florida
Parks in Pasco County, Florida
Tourist attractions in the Tampa Bay area